Holice is a town in Pardubice District in the Pardubice Region of the Czech Republic. It has about 6,500 inhabitants.

Administrative parts

Town parts and villages of Kamenec, Koudelka, Podhráz, Podlesí, Roveňsko and Staré Holice are administrative parts of Holice.

Geography
It lies in a flat landscape of the East Elbe Table lowland. The Ředický stream flows through the town.

History
The first written mention of Holice is from 1336, when it was property of John of Bohemia as a part of the Chvojnov estate. In the 15th century, it was referred to as a market town with a fortress and a church. In 1931, it was promoted to a town.

Demographics

Sport
Near Kamenec, there is a motocross track which bears the name of Michael Špaček.

Sights

The African Museum of Dr. Emil Holub is a museum dedicated to Emil Holub, the most notable local native. It was originally a memorial hall opened in 1956 and later a memorial, which was renamed the museum in 2012.

Notable people
Emil Holub (1847–1902), African explorer
Harry Horner (1910–1994), art director and set designer
Václav Lohniský (1920–1980), actor
Jan Kačer (born 1936), actor and director

Twin towns – sister cities

Holice is twinned with:
 Medzev, Slovakia
 Strzelce Opolskie, Poland

References

External links

 
Museum of Emil Holub

Populated places in Pardubice District
Cities and towns in the Czech Republic
Shtetls